Jinki may refer to:

 , a Japanese era, a Japanese era name (年号, nengō,?, lit. "year name") after Yōrō and before Tenpyō. This period spanned the years from February 724 through August 729. The reigning emperor was Shōmu-tennō (聖武天皇?)
 , an item used in Shinto ceremonies to worship kami
 Jinki (robot), the form of mecha that exists in the 2005 anime series Jinki: Extend
 Jinki (weapon), an anti-Gear divine weapon set in the Guilty Gear video game series
 Jinkies, a catchphrase from Scooby-Doo
 Lee Jinki (born 1989), leader of the boy band Shinee
Jinki, an Aboriginal Australian, AKA Kerrianne Cox a musician